Why Me? is a live album recorded in Germany by Daniel Johnston.

Track listing

References 

Daniel Johnston albums
2000 live albums